Lumpkin County is a county located in the north central portion of the U.S. state of Georgia. As of the 2020 census, the population was 33,488. Its county seat is Dahlonega.

History 
This area was settled by the Cherokee, who also occupied areas of what became delimited as southeastern Tennessee and western North Carolina.

Lumpkin County was created on December 3, 1832. The county was named for Wilson Lumpkin, who at the time was Governor of Georgia.  Lumpkin's daughter, Martha Wilson Lumpkin Compton, was the namesake of the town named Marthasville, the early-1840s name for Atlanta in Fulton County; this was designated as the capital of the state after the Civil War.

In the 1830s, gold was discovered in the county near Auraria, leading to a rush of miners and development. The U.S. government established a mint in Dahlonega, operating for 23 years until the outbreak of the American Civil War.  State contractors later acquired gold from Lumpkin County to gild the dome of the current state capitol building in Atlanta.

20th century to present
Agriculture and agritourism are top business industries. In addition, vineyards have been developed here and, since the mid-1990s, Lumpkin County has been recognized as "the heart of Georgia wine country."  The county features several vineyards and five licensed wineries, which attract many tourists.  In 2015, state senator Steve Gooch introduced Georgia Senate Resolution 125, officially recognizing Lumpkin County as the Wine Tasting Room Capital of Georgia.

The historic Dahlonega Square is also a popular destination. It has gift shops, restaurants, art galleries and artists' studios, and additional tasting rooms.

Lumpkin County is the home of the U.S. Army's Camp Frank D. Merrill, the base of the 5th Ranger Training Battalion of the U.S. Army Ranger School's mountain phase.  Camp Frank D. Merrill is located in the northern end of the county, within the Blue Ridge Wildlife Management Area of the Chattahoochee National Forest.

Three veterans' organizations are located in Lumpkin County, to serve the veterans and the community: the Heyward Fields American Legion Post 239, the US Army Mountain Ranger Association, and the Lumpkin and White County Veterans of Foreign Wars Post 5533.

Lumpkin County has an agency to help veterans, the Lumpkin County Veterans Affairs Advisory Committee. This group is in charge of the Lumpkin County Veterans Memorial and the twice yearly veterans' memorial crosses, which are installed to line both sides of the major roads in Dahlonega from mid-May through the Fourth of July, and again for the month of November.  The crosses are adorned with the names of the county's veterans who have died, some in combat (marked with KIA), and those who returned home and later died.

Geography

The county is located in the Blue Ridge Mountains. The summit of Blood Mountain, which Lumpkin County shares with Union County to the north, is the highest point in the county.  At , Blood Mountain is the 5th-highest peak in Georgia and the highest point on Georgia's portion of the Appalachian Trail.

The western 40% of Lumpkin County is located in the Etowah River sub-basin of the ACT River Basin (Alabama-Coosa-Tallapoosa River Basin), while the eastern 60% of the county is located in the Upper Chattahoochee River sub-basin of the ACF River Basin (Apalachicola-Chattahoochee-Flint River Basin).

Major highways

  U.S. Route 19
  U.S. Route 19 Business
  U.S. Route 129
  State Route 9
  State Route 11
  State Route 52
  State Route 60
  State Route 60 Business
  State Route 115
  State Route 400

Adjacent counties
 Union County – north
 White County – east
 Hall County – southeast
 Dawson County – west
 Fannin County – northwest

National protected area
 Chattahoochee National Forest (part)

Demographics

2010 census
As of the 2010 United States Census, there were 29,966 people, 10,989 households, and 7,645 families living in the county. The racial makeup of the county was 94.4% white, 1.1% black or African American, 0.6% American Indian, 0.5% Asian, 0.1% Pacific islander, 1.5% from other races, and 1.8% from two or more races. Those of Hispanic or Latino origin made up 4.5% of the population. In terms of ancestry, 17.6% were American, 17.5% were Irish, 15.6% were English, 14.4% were German, and 5.0% were Scotch-Irish.

Of the 10,989 households, 31.1% had children under the age of 18 living with them, 55.3% were married couples living together, 9.6% had a female householder with no husband present, 30.4% were non-families, and 22.2% of all households were made up of individuals. The average household size was 2.56 and the average family size was 3.00. The median age was 36.1 years.

The median income for a household in the county was $43,394 and the median income for a family was $50,318. Males had a median income of $38,043 versus $30,755 for females. The per capita income for the county was $20,088. About 9.2% of families and 15.2% of the population were below the poverty line, including 15.9% of those under age 18 and 11.2% of those age 65 or over.

2020 census

As of the 2020 United States census, there were 33,488 people, 11,570 households, and 7,800 families residing in the county.

Education

Lumpkin County School System manages and operates the public schools. There is one high school (Lumpkin County High School), one middle school (Lumpkin County Middle School), and three elementary schools (Lumpkin County Elementary School, Long Branch Elementary School, and Blackburn Elementary School). The University of North Georgia has its campus in Lumpkin County.

Politics

Communities
 Auraria
 Dahlonega

See also

 National Register of Historic Places listings in Lumpkin County, Georgia
List of counties in Georgia

References

 
Georgia (U.S. state) counties
1832 establishments in Georgia (U.S. state)
Populated places established in 1832
Northeast Georgia
Counties of Appalachia